Conasprella mcgintyi is a species of predatory sea snail, a marine gastropod mollusk in the family Conidae, the cone snails, cone shells or cones.

Like all species within the genus Conasprella, these cone snails are predatory and venomous. They are capable of "stinging" humans; therefore, live ones should be handled carefully or not at all.

Distribution
This is a western Atlantic species, which occurs from Florida to Brazil, as well as in the Gulf of Mexico.

Description 
Conasprella mcgintyi has elongate, many-whorled shell with a high conical spire. The external coloration is white with orange markings.

The maximum recorded shell length is 52.2 mm.

Habitat 
Minimum recorded depth is 55 m. Maximum recorded depth is 219 m.

References

  Puillandre N., Duda T.F., Meyer C., Olivera B.M. & Bouchet P. (2015). One, four or 100 genera? A new classification of the cone snails. Journal of Molluscan Studies. 81: 1-23

External links
 Conus mcgintyi - Information. Note that the species name of this cone is incorrectly spelled on that site.
 Malacolog Version 4.1.0 : A Database of Western Atlantic Marine Mollusca
 photo
 Cone Shells - Knights of the Sea
 

mcgintyi
Gastropods described in 1955